Bathytoma paratractoides is a species of sea snail, a marine gastropod mollusk in the family Borsoniidae.

Distribution
This marine species occurs in the Southwestern Pacific off the Solomon Islands.

Description
The height of this species varies between 47 mm and 52 mm. This species is very similar to Bathytoma atractoides (Watson, 1881) from the Philippines, mainly distinguished by their relative diameter/height ratio.

References

 Puillandre N., Sysoev A.V., Olivera B.M., Couloux A. & Bouchet P. (2010) Loss of planktotrophy and speciation: geographical fragmentation in the deep-water gastropod genus Bathytoma (Gastropoda, Conoidea) in the western Pacific. Systematics and Biodiversity 8(3): 371-394

External links
 Gastropods.com: Bathytoma paratractoides
 MNHN, Paris: Bathytoma paratractoides (holotype)

paratractoides
Gastropods described in 2010